The Journal of the Brazilian Computer Society (JBCS) is the flagship scientific journal of the Brazilian Computer Society (SBC). It is a quarterly journal. Its aim is to publish original research papers, serving as a forum for disseminating innovative research in all aspects of computer science. The priorities of the journal are quality and timeliness.

The first edition of the newspaper appeared in July 1994. For purposes of citation, the abbreviation 'J. Braz. Comp. Soc.' is often used.

JBCS is supported by the:

 Programa de Apoio a Publicações Científicas of the Ministério da Ciência e Tecnologia.
 Conselho Nacional de Desenvolvimento Científico e Tecnológico (CNPq).
 Conselho de Aperfeiçoamento do Ensino Superior (CAPES).
 Ministério da Educação (MEC).

References

External links 
 

Publications established in 1994
Computer science journals
Academic journals published by learned and professional societies of Brazil
Open access journals